Chottanikkara Amma is a 1976 Indian Malayalam film, directed by Crossbelt Mani and produced by Thiruvonam Pictures. The film stars Srividya, Kaviyoor Ponnamma, Adoor Bhasi and Hari in the lead roles. The film has musical score by R. K. Shekhar and lyrics by Bharanikkavu Sivakumar

Plot

A family of four visit the temple of the almighty Chottanikkara Devi to get rid of the evil possessing their daughter. They are aided by a humble saint, who provides them shelter and other needs. The saint then narrates the story of how the temple came into existence and other legends associated with the temple. Later, they enter the temple, where they witness the Keezhkavu pooja. During this time, Chottanikkara Devi battles the evil being and frees their daughter from possession.

Cast
 
Srividya as Chottanikkara Devi
Kaviyoor Ponnamma 
Adoor Bhasi as pandarapadi kamadevan
Hari 
Prema 
Shobha 
Sreelatha Namboothiri as kamakashi varassyar
Vaikom Mani
Cochin Haneefa as Kannappan
Nilambur Balan 
Unnimary 
Anandavally 
Balan K. Nair As vilwamangalam swamiyar
Jameela Malik 
Kedamangalam Ali 
Kuthiravattam Pappu 
Master Sekhar
Meena 
Nellikode Bhaskaran 
Rajakokila 
Ravi Menon 
Ravikumar 
Vanchiyoor Madhavan Nair 
Vettoor Purushan
Vincent

Soundtrack
The music was composed by R. K. Shekhar.

References

External links
 

1976 films
1970s Malayalam-language films